Denis Glavina (born 3 March 1986) is a Croatian professional footballer who plays for NK Međimurje in the Croatian Second Football League.

Career

Club
Glavina transferred to FC Dynamo Kyiv from Dinamo Zagreb in January 2004, but never appeared in a league match for Dynamo. He spent the 2006–07 and 2007–08 seasons on loan at Dnipro Dnipropetrovsk and Vorskla, respectively, before signing a permanent deal with Vorskla in June 2008. Glavina appeared in 8 league matches during the 2006–07 season and 26 league matches during the 2007–08 season, scoring three goals.

On 7 July 2009 he was loaned back to his first senior club, Dinamo Zagreb. At the start of the season he featured in both matches of UEFA Champions League qualifiers against Red Bull Salzburg.

He signed a two-year contract with Polish club Arka Gdynia on 9 July 2010. He was released from Arka Gdynia on 30 June 2011. In February 2012, Glavina joined Varaždin. In August 2012, Glavina signed a two-year contract with RNK Split. In 2020 he joined Varaždin, a club not associated with the Varaždin team he played with earlier in his career, which folded in 2015.

National team
Denis Glavina has represented Croatia at the youth international levels, playing for under-17, under-19 and under-21 teams, making a total of 33 caps and scoring 10 goals.

Personal life
Glavina is married with a Ukrainian woman Kateryna from Dnipro.

Honours
Vorskla Poltava
 Ukrainian Cup (1): 2008-09

References

External links
 
 
 
 

1986 births
Living people
Sportspeople from Čakovec
Association football wingers
Croatian footballers
Croatia youth international footballers
Croatia under-21 international footballers
FC Dynamo-2 Kyiv players
FC Vorskla Poltava players
FC Dnipro players
GNK Dinamo Zagreb players
Arka Gdynia players
NK Varaždin players
RNK Split players
NK Zavrč players
FC Tobol players
FC Akzhayik players
FC Zhetysu players
NK Varaždin (2012) players
NK Međimurje players
Ukrainian Premier League players
Croatian Football League players
Ekstraklasa players
Slovenian PrvaLiga players
Kazakhstan Premier League players
First Football League (Croatia) players
Croatian expatriate footballers
Expatriate footballers in Ukraine
Croatian expatriate sportspeople in Ukraine
Expatriate footballers in Poland
Croatian expatriate sportspeople in Poland
Expatriate footballers in Slovenia
Croatian expatriate sportspeople in Slovenia
Expatriate footballers in Kazakhstan
Croatian expatriate sportspeople in Kazakhstan